Joé Flick (born 16 July 1979) is a Luxembourgian footballer.

Club career
A goalkeeper, he has played for Etzella from 2007, after joining them from Jeunesse Esch-sur-Alzette.

External links 

 

1979 births
Living people
Luxembourgian footballers
Union Luxembourg players
Jeunesse Esch players
FC Etzella Ettelbruck players
Luxembourg international footballers
Association football goalkeepers